In archaeogenetics, the term Western Hunter-Gatherer (WHG), West European Hunter-Gatherer, Western European Hunter-Gatherer, or Villabruna cluster names a distinct ancestral component of modern Europeans, representing descent from a population of Mesolithic hunter-gatherers scattered over Western, Southern and Central Europe, from the British Isles in the west to the Carpathians in the east.

Along with the Scandinavian Hunter-Gatherers (SHG) and Eastern Hunter-Gatherers (EHG), the WHGs constituted one of the three main genetic groups in the postglacial period of early Holocene Europe. The border between WHGs and EHGs ran roughly from the lower Danube, northward along the western forests of the Dnieper towards the western Baltic Sea.

SHGs were in turn an equal mix of WHGs and EHGs. Once the main population throughout Europe, the WHGs were largely displaced by successive expansions of Early European Farmers (EEFs) during the early Neolithic, but experienced a resurgence during the Middle Neolithic, mainly mediated by WHG males mating with EEF females. During the Late Neolithic and Early Bronze Age, Western Steppe Herders (WSHs) from the Pontic–Caspian steppe embarked on a massive expansion, which further displaced the WHGs. Among modern-day populations, WHG ancestry is most common among populations of the eastern Baltic.

Research
Western Hunter-Gatherers (WHG) are recognised as a distinct ancestral component contributing to the ancestry to all modern Europeans, including Early European Farmers (EEF), who were, however, mostly of Anatolian descent. With the Neolithic expansion, EEF came to dominate the gene pool in most parts of Europe, although WHG ancestry had a resurgence in Western Europe from the Early Neolithic to the Middle Neolithic. Most Europeans can be modeled as a mixture of WHG, EEF and peoples from the Yamnaya culture of the Pontic–Caspian steppe.

WHGs themselves formed around 31,000 years ago, out from a yet undifferentiated Common West-Eurasian meta-population, although there existed different admixture events and substructured hunter-gatherer clines within Europe; in particular their relationship to the Eastern Hunter-Gatherers, remain inconclusive. EHGs are modeled to derive varying degrees of ancestry from a WHG-related lineage, ranging from merely 25% to up to 91%, with the remainder being linked to geneflow from Paleolithic Siberians (ANE) and perhaps Caucasus hunter-gatherers. Another lineage known as the Scandinavian Hunter-Gatherers (SHGs) were found to be a mix of EHGs and WHGs. It is thought that their ancestors separated from eastern Eurasians around 40,000 BP, and from Ancient North Eurasians (ANE) prior to 24,000 BP (the estimated age date of the Mal'ta boy). This date was subsequently put further back in time by the findings of the Yana Rhinoceros Horn Site to around 38kya, shortly after the divergence of West-Eurasian and East-Eurasian lineages.

People of the Mesolithic Kunda culture and the Narva culture of the eastern Baltic were a mix of WHG and EHG, showing the closest affinity with WHG. Samples from the Ukrainian Mesolithic and Neolithic were found to cluster tightly together between WHG and EHG, suggesting genetic continuity in the Dnieper Rapids for a period of 4,000 years. The Ukrainian samples belonged exclusively to the maternal haplogroup U, which is found in around 80% of all European hunter-gatherer samples.

People of the Pit–Comb Ware culture (CCC) of the eastern Baltic were closely related to EHG,.  Unlike most WHGs, the WHGs of the eastern Baltic did not receive European farmer admixture during the Neolithic. Modern populations of the eastern Baltic thus harbor a larger amount of WHG ancestry than any other population in Europe.

SHGs have been found to contain a mix of WHG components who had likely migrated into Scandinavia from the south, and EHGs who had later migrated into Scandinavia from the northeast along the Norwegian coast. This hypothesis is supported by evidence that SHGs from western and northern Scandinavia had less WHG ancestry (ca 51%) than individuals from eastern Scandinavia (ca. 62%). The WHGs who entered Scandinavia are believed to have belonged to the Ahrensburg culture. EHGs and WHGs displayed lower allele frequencies of SLC45A2 and SLC24A5, which cause depigmentation, and OCA/Herc2, which causes light eye color, than SHGs.

The DNA of eleven WHGs from the Upper Palaeolithic and Mesolithic in Western Europe, Central Europe and the Balkans was analyzed, with regards to their Y-DNA haplogroups and mtDNA haplogroups. The analysis suggested that WHGs were once widely distributed from the Atlantic coast in the West, to Sicily in the South, to the Balkans in the Southeast, for more than six thousand years. The study also included an analysis of a large number of individuals of prehistoric Eastern Europe. Thirty-seven samples were collected from Mesolithic and Neolithic Ukraine (9500-6000 BC). These were determined to be an intermediate between EHG and SHG, although WHG ancestry in this population increased during the Neolithic. Samples of Y-DNA extracted from these individuals belonged exclusively to R haplotypes (particularly subclades of R1b1) and I haplotypes (particularly subclades of I2). mtDNA belonged almost exclusively to U (particularly subclades of U5 and U4). A large number of individuals from the Zvejnieki burial ground, which mostly belonged to the Kunda culture and Narva culture in the eastern Baltic, were analyzed. These individuals were mostly of WHG descent in the earlier phases, but over time EHG ancestry became predominant. The Y-DNA of this site belonged almost exclusively to haplotypes of haplogroup R1b1a1a and I2a1. The mtDNA belonged exclusively to haplogroup U (particularly subclades of U2, U4 and U5). Forty individuals from three sites of the Iron Gates Mesolithic in the Balkans were also analyzed. These individuals were estimated to be of 85% WHG and 15% EHG descent. The males at these sites carried exclusively haplogroup R1b1a and I (mostly subclades of I2a) haplotypes. mtDNA belonged mostly to U (particularly subclades of U5 and U4). People of the Balkan Neolithic were found to harbor 98% Anatolian ancestry and 2% WHG ancestry. By the Chalcolithic, people of the Cucuteni–Trypillia culture were found to harbor about 20% hunter-gatherer ancestry, which was intermediate between EHG and WHG. People of the Globular Amphora culture were found to harbor ca. 25% WHG ancestry, which is significantly higher than Middle Neolithic groups of Central Europe.

Analysis of remains out of the Grotta Continenza in Italy showed  that of the six paternal haplogroups the three buried between ca. 10,000 BC and 7000 BC were of I2a-P214); of the presumably WHG maternal haplogroups were two U5b1 and one U5b3. Around 6000 BC, the WHGs of Italy were almost completely genetically replaced by EEFs (two G2a2) and one Haplogroup R1b, although WHG ancestry slightly increased in subsequent millennia.

Neolithic individuals in the British Isles were close to Iberian and Central European Early and Middle Neolithic populations, modelled as having about 75% ancestry from EEF with the rest coming from WHG in continental Europe. They subsequently replaced most of the WHG population in the British Isles without mixing much with them.

Physical appearance
According to David Reich, DNA analysis has shown that Western Hunter Gatherers were typically dark skinned, dark haired, and blue eyed. Archaeologist Graeme Warren has said that their skin color ranged from olive to black, and speculated that they may have had some regional variety of eye and hair colors. This is strikingly different from the Eastern Hunter-Gatherers (EHG)—who have been suggested to be light-skinned, brown-eyed or blue eyed and dark-haired or light-haired.

Two WHG skeletons with incomplete SNPs, La Braña and Cheddar Man, are predicted to have had dark or dark-to-black skin, whereas two other WHG skeletons with complete SNPs, "Sven" and Loschbour man, are predicted to have had dark/intermediate and intermediate skin, respectively.

Notes

References

Bibliography

Further reading

 
 

WHG
Genetic history of Europe
Peopling of the world
Indo-European genetics
Last Glacial Maximum
Mesolithic Europe
Hunter-gatherers of Europe